Twin Beds is a 1929 American comedy film directed by Alfred Santell and written by F. McGrew Willis. It is based on the 1914 play Twin Beds by Edward Salisbury Field and Margaret Mayo. The film stars Jack Mulhall, Patsy Ruth Miller, Edythe Chapman, Knute Erickson, Jocelyn Lee and Nita Martan. The film was released by Warner Bros. on July 14, 1929.

Plot
Elsie Dolan (Patsy Ruth Miller), accidentally finding herself in the office of songwriter Danny Brown (Jack Mulhall), achieves Broadway success with Danny's help. Marrying Danny out of gratitude, she is temporarily enchanted by her egotistical leading man Monty Solari (Armand Kaliz), leading to an evening of misunderstandings, door-slammings and hasty retreats under the bed when the very-married Solari wanders drunkenly into Danny and Elsie's apartment. Previously filmed in 1920, Twin Beds was memorably remade in 1942 with George Brent, Joan Bennett and Mischa Auer.

Cast       
Jack Mulhall as Danny Brown
Patsy Ruth Miller as Elsie Dolan
Edythe Chapman as Ma Dolan
Knute Erickson as Pa Dolan
Jocelyn Lee as Mazie Dolan
Nita Martan as Bobby Dolan
ZaSu Pitts as Tillie
Armand Kaliz as Monty Solari
Gertrude Astor as Mrs. Solari
Carl M. Leviness as Jason Treejohn 
Alice Lake as Mrs. Treejohn
Ben Hendricks Jr. as Pete Trapp
Eddie Gribbon as Red Trapp
Bert Roach as Edward J. Small

References

External links
 

1929 films
1920s English-language films
Silent American comedy films
1929 comedy films
First National Pictures films
Films directed by Alfred Santell
American black-and-white films
1920s American films